The Executive of 1822 was one of the two chambers that were set up in the First National Assembly at Epidaurus. There were five members, and they had to implement the decisions of Legislative Corps. The term of the office was initially set to one year. The Executive's tenure lasted from January 1822 to April 1823, when the Second National Assembly at Astros elected a new Executive. 

The Executive's members, as elected by the First National Assembly, were:
 Alexandros Mavrokordatos, President of the Executive
 Athanasios Kanakaris, died in January 1823
 Ioannis Orlandos 
 Anagnostis Deligiannis
 Ioannis Logothetis

Ministers 

In February 1822 the three-member Committee for the Ministry of Naval Affairs was appointed:
 N. Panteli Nikolakis
 Andreas Chatzianargyrou
 Ioannis Nikolaou Lazarou

In June 1822, Fransesco Voulgaris replaced N. Panteli Nikolakis.

Cabinets of Greece
1822 in Greece
1823 in Greece
Political institutions of the Greek War of Independence